Yves Brun is an American biologist, currently a Distinguished Professor and Clyde Culbertson Professor at Indiana University.

References

Year of birth missing (living people)
Living people
Indiana University faculty
21st-century American biologists
Stanford University alumni
Université Laval alumni